Carin Ingeborg Lundberg (born 1944) is a Swedish politician and former member of the Riksdag, the national legislature. A member of the Social Democratic Party, she represented Västerbotten County between September 1991 and October 2006.

References

1944 births
20th-century Swedish women politicians
20th-century Swedish politicians
21st-century Swedish women politicians
Living people
Members of the Riksdag 1991–1994
Members of the Riksdag 1994–1998
Members of the Riksdag 1998–2002
Members of the Riksdag 2002–2006
Members of the Riksdag from the Social Democrats
Women members of the Riksdag